Det Blå Marked is a chain of Danish antique markets owned by Lars Kristensen.

The first property was opened in Børkop, with others opening later in Låsby, Haslev and Randers. Only the Haslev and Låsby markets still operate, although all were commercially successful.

The current flagship property is located in the town of Låsby in Jutland, and is a major tourist attraction, bringing in over half a million visitors every year.

External links
Official website
Website for the market in Haslev

Retail companies of Denmark